Platorchestia is a genus of sand flea, containing the following species:

Platorchestia ashmoleorum Stock, 1996
Platorchestia bousfieldi Hou & Li, 2003
Platorchestia chathamensis Bousfield, 1982
Platorchestia crassicornis (Costa, 1867)
Platorchestia dispar (Dana, 1852)
Platorchestia humicola (Martens, 1868)
Platorchestia japonica (Tattersall, 1922)
Platorchestia joi Stock & Biernbaum, 1994
Platorchestia kaalensis (J. L. Barnard, 1955)
Platorchestia lanipo Richardson, 1991
Platorchestia monodi Stock, 1996
Platorchestia munmui Jo, 1988
Platorchestia pachypus (Derzhavin, 1937)
Platorchestia pacifica Miyamoto & Morino, 2004
Platorchestia paraplatensis Serejo & Lowry, 2008
Platorchestia pickeringi (Dana, 1853)
Platorchestia platensis (Krøyer, 1845)
Platorchestia zachsi (Derzhavin, 1937)

References

Gammaridea